Kerr Park is an urban park in Oklahoma City, in the U.S. state of Oklahoma.

History
Occupy OKC, an affiliate of the Occupy movement, was stationed in the park in 2011.

The park was renovated in 2018.

References

Geography of Oklahoma City
Parks in Oklahoma
Urban public parks